Adalgisa Maria Soares Ximenes (born March 13, 1968) is a diplomat and former politician in East Timor.

She was born in Dili and received her primary and secondary education in Viqueque. She went on to earn a bachelor's degree from the University of Brawijaya in Malang, Indonesia and to pursue post-graduate studies in education at the National University of East Timor. She was elected to the National Parliament of East Timor in 2001 as a member of the Revolutionary Front for an Independent East Timor (FRETLIN) and served until 2007. Before being elected to the assembly, she served as an administrator and then project officer for CARE International. During her time in the assembly, she served as president of the Permanent Commission for Health and Labor.

From 2009 to 2010, she served as head of the National Commission for Child Rights in East Timor. In 2016, Ximenes was named ambassador to South Korea.

References 

1968 births
Living people
Fretilin politicians
Members of the National Parliament (East Timor)
East Timorese women in politics
Ambassadors of East Timor to South Korea
People from Dili
East Timorese women diplomats
National University of East Timor alumni
Women ambassadors